Pangil Bhaskaran is an Indian novelist writing in Malayalam. Bhaskaran has also been a college teacher, farmer, journalist, and government official in revenue department.

Works
 Pattunoolpuzhukkal
 Mulayaruthum Mudi Murichum
 Orumpettaval
 Vellinakshatrangale Thedi (1981)
 Abhishekachadangile Balan (1982)
 Sundarippasu (1986)
 Mezhukuthirikal (1986)
 Oonuvadikal (1987)
 Bhrithyanmar (1990)
 Sahayatrikar (1996)
 Odampal (1999)
 Thanne Parannathum Thalli Parathiyathum (2011)
 Akathalam (2013)
 Oru Njandinte Aathmakatha (2014)
 Veerangana (2015)
 Nandikeshan Sakshi (2017)
 Krishnante Jananavum Sakhavu Sekharanum (2017)
 Engane Kadaledukkunna Kure Jeevithangal (2017)

Awards
 Abu Dhabi Sakthi Award for the novel Bhrithyanmar in 1987.
 Aksharakkoottam Award for 'Akathalam' in 2013.

References

External links
 Bhāskaran, Pāṅṅil
 Bhāskaran, Pāṅṅil

Living people
Novelists from Kerala
20th-century Indian novelists
Indian male novelists
Indian male short story writers
20th-century Indian short story writers
20th-century Indian male writers
1945 births
Recipients of the Abu Dhabi Sakthi Award